Lophocampa sesia is a moth of the family Erebidae. It was described by Jan Sepp in 1852. It is found in Suriname.

References

 Natural History Museum Lepidoptera generic names catalog

sesia
Moths described in 1852
Taxa named by Jan Sepp